SMART-S Mk2 (Signaal Multibeam Acquisition Radar for Tracking, S band Mk2) is a naval medium to long-range air and surface surveillance multibeam passive electronically scanned array 3D radar designed by Thales Nederland, formerly Hollandse Signaalapparaten (Signaal). While the original SMART-S radar was only produced in small numbers, SMART-S Mk2 is very successful. Only six years after its introduction, 30 systems were sold to navies all over the world. SMART-S Mk2 radar is equipped with transmitter/receiver (T/R) modules manufactured by Turkish defence company Aselsan. The radar transmitter/receiver (T/R) modules for the radar are purchased by Thales from Aselsan.

Overview
The radar mainly designed for light frigates, corvettes and ships such as Landing Platform Docks (LPD). SMART-S Mk2 is designed to support full performance of surface to air missiles (SAM), such as the RIM-162 ESSM.

Antenna system: 
Number of beams formed: 12
Identification friend or foe (IFF) system integrated
Maximum detection ranges:
Stealth missiles: 
Patrol aircraft: 
Range accuracy: < 
Maximal numbers of tracked targets:
Sea+Air: 500 / 700
Cooling: Chilled water
Fully automatic detection and tracking of air and surface targets
Dedicated electronic counter-countermeasure (ECCM) techniques
Jammer detection and tracking
Automatic Target Classification

Users
 
  (MILGEM project, license produced / assembled by ASELSAN)
 
 
  (Royal New Zealand Navy, SMART-S Mk2 as part of the ANZAC Frigate System Upgrade)
 
 
 
  (Mk1)
 
 
  ( patrol vessel)
 
 
  (Upgraded Mk1)
 
  
  (Egyptian Navy)
  
  (Gowind 2500 Egypt, Gowind 2500 United Arab Emirates)
  (SIGMA 9813 & SIGMA 10513 Morocco, SIGMA 10514 LROPV/POLA Mexico)

Future users
  - MILGEM Pakistan
  - 
 Hetman Ivan Mazepa-class corvette - MILGEM Ukraine
  - Gowind 3100 Malaysia

See also
Thales SMART-L, long range version in the SMART radar family.

References

Sea radars
Aselsan products
Military equipment introduced in the 2000s